Munch'ŏn station is a railway station in Munch'ŏn-dong, greater Munch'ŏn city, Kangwŏn province, North Korea, on the Kangwŏn Line of the Korean State Railway. Originally called Munp'yŏng station (Chosŏn'gŭl: 문평역; Hanja: 文坪驛), the station, along with the rest of the Okp'yŏng–Wŏnsan section of the former Hamgyŏng Line, was opened by the Japanese on 1 August 1915. It received its current name after the establishment of the DPRK.

This station serves the Munp'yŏng smelter and the May 18th Works factory.

References

Railway stations in North Korea
Railway stations opened in 1915